Đurđa "Đurđica" Bjedov (born 5 April 1947) is a retired Croatian swimmer and the only Yugoslav Olympic champion in swimming.

Bjedov never won a medal at major international competitions, except for the 1968 Olympics, where she finished first in the 100 m breaststroke, breaking the Olympic record, and second in the 200 m breaststroke. Her medley relay team was disqualified in the preliminaries though because she jumped into water too early. Later that year she was selected as the Yugoslav Athlete of the Year.

After retiring from competitions Bjedov worked as a swimming coach and raised her daughter Anamarija Petričević to become an Olympic swimmer. They both now live in Locarno, Switzerland. Bjedov is the only Yugoslav swimmer inducted into the International Swimming Hall of Fame.

See also
 List of members of the International Swimming Hall of Fame

References

1947 births
Living people
Female breaststroke swimmers
Swimmers at the 1968 Summer Olympics
Olympic gold medalists for Yugoslavia
Olympic silver medalists for Yugoslavia
Yugoslav female swimmers
Sportspeople from Split, Croatia
Olympic swimmers of Yugoslavia
Croatian female swimmers
Croatian expatriate sportspeople in Switzerland
Medalists at the 1968 Summer Olympics
Olympic gold medalists in swimming
Olympic silver medalists in swimming
People from Locarno
Universiade medalists in swimming
Universiade silver medalists for Yugoslavia
Universiade bronze medalists for Yugoslavia
Medalists at the 1970 Summer Universiade
Sportspeople from Ticino